Mandaloun (foaled March 18, 2018) is a retired American Thoroughbred racehorse who finished second behind Medina Spirit in the 2021 Kentucky Derby followed by winning both the Pegasus Stakes and Haskell Stakes. He also won the 2021 Risen Star Stakes, and the 2022 Louisiana Stakes.

Background
Mandaloun is a bay colt who was foaled in Kentucky. He is ridden by jockey Florent Geroux and trained by Brad H. Cox. The horse is named for a mandaloun, "a type of mullioned (or decorative partition) window from traditional Lebanese architecture".

Racing career

2020: Two-year-old season
Mandaloun made his first start in a maiden race on October 24th in Keeneland over 6 furlongs. He won this race by  lengths in a time of 1:11.76. His second start was in an Allowance Optional Claiming, in Churchill Downs over 7 furlongs, on November 28, 2020. He won in a time of 1:23.15 by  lengths.

2021: Three-year-old season
Mandaloun made his first start as a three year old and his stakes debut in the Lecomte Stakes on January 16, 2021 at Fair Grounds over a distance of  miles. He finished third. Midnight Bourbon won by 1 length, Proxy was second by a head, the fourth place was  lengths behind the top three. On February 13, 2021, Mandaloun started again against Midnight Bourbon and Proxy in the Risen Star Stakes, over a distance of  miles. This time Mandaloun turned the tables and defeated Proxy by  lengths and Midnight Bourbon by  lengths. The other horses were  lengths or more behind the top three. The final time was 1:50.30. His last prep race for the 2021 Kentucky Derby was the Louisiana Derby; again he started against Midnight Bourbon and Proxy, but this time another rival, Hot Rod Charlie, started. Immediately after the start, Hot Rod Charlie took the lead and won wire to wire in track record time. Midnight Bourbon held on to finish second by a head while Mandaloun finished in a disappointing seventh place. Since neither Brad Cox nor Mandaloun's jockey Florent Geroux knew why he ran so badly, they brought him to Churchill Downs for the Kentucky Derby.

Kentucky Derby
On May 1, 2021, he was a long shot in the Kentucky Derby. The favorites were Essential Quality, his stablemate (winner of the Blue Grass Stakes), Rock Your World (winner of the Santa Anita Derby), and Hot Rod Charlie (winner of the Louisiana Derby). Other good horses in the running were Known Agenda (winner of the Florida Derby), Highly Motivated (runner-up in the Blue Grass Stakes), Medina Spirit (runner-up in the Santa Anita Derby), and his old rival Midnight Bourbon (runner-up in the Louisiana Derby). Mandaloun started well and was fourth. He slowly moved up and challenged the leader, Medina Spirit. Behind him, Hot Rod Charlie and his stablemate Essential Quality began to move up. There were four horses in the stretch. Medina Spirit won by  length, Mandaloun was second with  length, third was Hot Rod Charlie with a head to stablemate Essential Quality. 5th placed O Besos was  lengths behind them.

After the Kentucky Derby, an investigation was launched because of doping issues with Medina Spirit, who died on December 6, 2021; there was also an investigation of his trainer, Bob Baffert. On February 21, 2022, upon the disqualification of Medina Spirit, Mandaloun was awarded first place in the 2021 Kentucky Derby.

Later three-year-old season
Mandaloun skipped the next two legs of the Triple Crown, the Preakness Stakes won by Rombauer and Belmont Stakes won by Essential Quality.

Mandaloun made his next start in the  mile Pegasus Stakes at Monmouth Park on June 13, a local prep for the Haskell Stakes. He held on to win by a neck over a closing Weyburn in a final time of 1:44.63.

He then ran in the Grade 1 Haskell Stakes at Monmouth Park on July 17. He crossed the finish line second in a photo finish with Belmont runner up Hot Rod Charlie. However, Hot Rod Charlie was quickly disqualified for having impeded the path of Midnight Bourbon which caused him to throw his rider Paco Lopez, so Mandaloun was declared the official winner.

The following month, Garrett O’Rourke, the racing manager at Juddmonte, announced that Mandaloun would be taken out of training for about six weeks due to a foot sore, likely missing the remainder of the 2021 racing season. He added the horse would be aimed toward a potential start in the 2022 Saudi Cup.

2022: Four-year-old season

On 22 January 2022, resuming for his four-year-old season Mandaloun out dueled his rival Midnight Bourbon in the GIII Louisiana Stakes at Fair Grounds as the 9/10 odds-on favorite by  lengths, running the  miles distance in 1:42.52.

Racing statistics 

Notes:

Stud career

On 13 September 2022, it was announced that Mandaloun was retired from racing and would stand at Juddmonte USA at Lexington, Kentucky and that they set his stud fee at $25,000.

Pedigree

References

2018 racehorse births
Thoroughbred racehorses
Racehorses trained in the United States
American Grade 1 Stakes winners
Kentucky Derby winners